Igor Aleksandrovich Kachmazov (born 28 February 1962) is a Russian professional football coach and a former player.

Club career
He made his professional debut in the Soviet First League in 1980 for FC Spartak Ordzhonikidze.

Honours
 Russian Premier League runner-up: 1992.

References

1962 births
Sportspeople from Samara, Russia
Living people
Soviet footballers
Russian footballers
Association football forwards
FC Spartak Vladikavkaz players
FC Dynamo Stavropol players
Soviet Top League players
Russian Premier League players
Russian football managers